St. Andrew's Episcopal Church is a historic Episcopal church complex located at Buffalo in Erie County, New York, United States.  The church was completed in 1928 and is a Neo-Gothic style edifice.  It is built of cream and gray colored stone with a red ceramic tile roof.  Also on the property is a Queen Anne style rectory (1910) and concrete block garage.

It was listed on the National Register of Historic Places in 2010.

References

External links

Episcopal church buildings in New York (state)
Churches on the National Register of Historic Places in New York (state)
Queen Anne architecture in New York (state)
Gothic Revival church buildings in New York (state)
Churches in Buffalo, New York
Anglo-Catholic church buildings in the United States
National Register of Historic Places in Buffalo, New York
Churches completed in 1928
Religious organizations established in 1891